This article serves as an index – as complete as possible – of all the honorific orders or similar decorations awarded by Kelantan, classified by Monarchies chapter and Republics chapter, and, under each chapter, recipients' countries and the detailed list of recipients.

Awards

MONARCHIES

Kelantan Royal Family 
They have been awarded:

 Muhammad V of Kelantan, Sultan of Kelantan (since 13 September 2010) :
  Recipient (DK, 6.10.1986) and Grand Master of the Royal Family Order or Star of Yunus
  Knight Grand Commander and Grand Master of the Order of the Crown of Kelantan or "Star of Muhammad" with title (SPMK, since 13 September 2010) with titile Dato  Knight Grand Commander and Grand Master of the Order of the Life of the Crown of Kelantan or "Star of Ismail" (SJMK, since 13 September 2010) with title Dato  Knight Grand Commander and Grand Master of the Order of the Loyalty to the Crown of Kelantan or "Star of Ibrahim" (SPSK, since 13 September 2010) with title Dato  Grand Master of the Order of the Noble Crown of Kelantan or "Star of Yahya" (SPKK, since 13 September 2010) with title Dato  Grand Master of the Order of the Most Distinguished and Most Valiant Warrior (PYGP, since 13 September 2010)
  Founding Grand Master of the Most Loyal Order of Services to the Crown of Kelantan or "Star of Petra" (SPJK, since 11 November 2016) with title Dato Ismail Petra of Kelantan, Sultan Muhammad V of Kelantan's father and retired Sultan for illness :
  Recipient and Grand Master of the Royal Family Order of Kelantan (DK, 29 March 1979 - 13 September 2010)
  Knight Grand Commander and Grand Master of the Order of the Crown of Kelantan (SPMK, 29 March 1979 - 13 September 2010) with title Dato  Knight Grand Commander and Grand Master of the Order of the Life of the Crown of Kelantan (SJMK, 29 March 1979 - 13 September 2010) with title Dato  Knight Grand Commander and Grand Master of the Order of the Loyalty to the Crown of Kelantan (SPSK, 29 March 1979 - 13 September 2010) with title Dato  Founding Grand Master of the Order of the Noble Crown of Kelantan (SPKK, 1988 - 13 September 2010) with title Dato  Grand Master of the Order of the Most Distinguished and Most Valiant Warrior (PYGP, 29 March 1979 - 13 September 2010)
 Raja Perempuan Tengku Anis, Sultan Muhammad V of Kelantan's mother :
  Recipient of the Royal Family Order or Star of Yunus (DK, 30.3.1980)
  Knight Grand Commander of the Order of the Crown of Kelantan or "Star of Muhammad" (SPMK) with title Dato Tengku Muhammad Faiz Petra, eldest younger brother of Sultan Muhammad V of Kelantan
  Recipient of the Royal Family Order or Star of Yunus (DK, 30.3.2003)
  Knight Grand Commander of the Order of the Crown of Kelantan or "Star of Muhammad" (SPMK) with title Dato'''
 Tengku Muhammad Fakhry Petra, second younger brother of Sultan Muhammad V of Kelantan
  Recipient of the Royal Family Order or Star of Yunus (DK)
  Knight Grand Commander (SPMK) of the Order of the Crown of Kelantan or "Star of Muhammad"  with title Dato
 He was once DK (30.3.2003) and SPMK but those titles were rescinded by the Sultan on 30.9.2010. In 2019, the Sultan has consented to restore DK to him. SPMK status unknown.
 Tengku Amalin Aishah Putri, sister of Sultan Muhammad V of Kelantan
  Recipient of the Royal Family Order or Star of Yunus (DK)
 Tengku Abdul Halim, granduncle of Sultan Muhammad V of Kelantan 
  Recipient of the Royal Family Order or Star of Yunus (DK)
  Knight Grand Commander of the Order of the Life of the Crown of Kelantan or Star of Ismail (SJMK) with title Dato
 Tengku Mohamad Rizam, cousin of Sultan Muhammad V of Kelantan
  Recipient of the Royal Family Order or Star of Yunus (DK)
  Knight Grand Commander of the Order of the Crown of Kelantan or "Star of Muhammad" (SPMK) with title Dato
  Knight Grand Commander of the Order of the Life of the Crown of Kelantan or Star of Ismail (SJMK) with title Dato
 STATES of MALAYSIA 

  Johor Royal Family 
They have been awarded :

 Sultan Ibrahim Ismail of Johor :
  Recipient of the Royal Family Order or Star of Yunus (DK) 

  Kedah Royal Family 
They were awarded :
 Sultan Sallehuddin of Kedah (3rd younger brother of the late Sultan and member of the Regency Council 2011):
  Recipient of the Royal Family Order or Star of Yunus (DK, 9.2017)

  Negeri Sembilan Royal Family 
They have been awarded :

 Tuanku Muhriz of Negeri Sembilan, Yang di-Pertuan Besar :
  Recipient of the Royal Family Order or Star of Yunus (DK)
 Tuanku Najihah, widow of late  Yang di-Pertuan Besar Jaafar of Negeri Sembilan :
  Recipient of the Royal Family Order or Star of Yunus (DK)
  Knight Grand Commander of the Order of the Crown of Kelantan or "Star of Muhammad" (SPMK, 11.11.1992) with title Dato 

  Pahang Royal Family 
They have been awarded :

 Sultan Ahmad Shah of Pahang : 
  Recipient of the Royal Family Order or Star of Yunus (DK)
 Tengku Abdullah, Tengku Arif Bendahara, second younger brother of the sultan.
  Knight Commander of the Order of the Life of the Crown of Kelantan or Star of Ismail (DJMK) with title Dato

  Perak Royal Family 

 Sultan Nazrin Shah of Perak 
  Recipient of the Royal Family Order or Star of Yunus (DK)

  Perlis Royal Family 
They have been awarded :

 Tuanku Sirajuddin of Perlis :
  Recipient of the Royal Family Order or Star of Yunus (DK, 2002)
 Tuanku Fauziah (Tuanku Sirajuddin of Perlis's wife) :
   Recipient of the Royal Family Order or Star of Yunus (DK, 2002)

  Selangor Royal Family 
They have been awarded :

 Sultan Sharafuddin of Selangor :
  Recipient of the Royal Family Order or Star of Yunus (DK)
 Tengku Permaisuri Norashikin, Consort of Sultan Sharafuddin 
  Knight Grand Commander of the Order of the Crown of Kelantan or "Star of Muhammad" (SPMK, 2018) with title Dato
 Tengku Amir Shah, Crown Prince of Selangor
  Knight Grand Commander of the Order of the Crown of Kelantan or "Star of Muhammad" (SPMK, 2011) with title Dato 
 Tengku Sulaiman Shah, eldest younger brother of Sultan Sharafuddin :
  Knight Grand Commander of the Order of the Life of the Crown of Kelantan or Star of Ismail (SJMK) with title Dato
 Tengku Putra, cousin of Sultan Sharafuddin :
  Knight Commander of the Order of the Life of the Crown of Kelantan or Star of Ismail (DJMK) with title Dato

  Terengganu Royal Family 

 Sultan Mizan Zainal Abidin of Terengganu (Sultan : since 15 May 1998 - Y.d-P.A. 12/2006-12/2011):
  Recipient of the Royal Family Order or Star of Yunus (DK, 30.3.2002)

  Governors of Malacca 

 Mohd Khalil Yaakob ( 6th Yang di-Pertua Negeri of Malacca since 4 June 2004 ) :
  Knight Grand Commander of the Order of the Life of the Crown of Kelantan  or "Star of Ismail" (SJMK) with title Dato'to be completed ASIAN MONARCHIES

  Brunei Royal Family See also List of Malaysian Honours awarded to Heads of State and RoyalsThey have been awarded :
 Hassanal Bolkiah : 
  Recipient of the Royal Family Order or Star of Yunus (DK, 3.8.1968)
 Queen Saleha, his first wife : 
  Recipient of the Royal Family Order or Star of Yunus (DK, 7.3.1999)
 Mariam, his second wife : 
  Recipient of the Royal Family Order or Star of Yunus (DK, 7.3.1999)

  Thai Royal Family 
 Queen Sirikit of Thailand :  
  Recipient of the Royal Family Order or Star of Yunus (DK, 2004)to be completed EUROPEAN MONARCHIESto be completed REPUBLICS to be completed''

See also 
 Mirror page : List of honours of the Kelantan Royal Family by country

References 

 
Kelantan